Brendan Price is a British theatre, movie, and television actor. He graduated, winning the prize for outstanding dialect work and began his career in the regional theatres of England. He worked in a number of the major theatres, playing a diverse range of parts in the plays of Anton Chekhov, Shakespeare, Arthur Miller, and in those of many other writers, both classical and modern.

Television
His television career began in 1972 with a part in the BBC’s Play of The Month series in James Joyce's Stephen Dedalus.

For the next few years, his work moved freely between television and theatre until he made his first film, a starring role in the sex comedy Secrets of a Door-to-Door Salesman (1973), which was due to be directed by a young Jonathan Demme, but Demme was dismissed from the project. Price offered to resign his role in sympathy with him, but Demme counselled him to stay with the part, imparting the advice "In this business these things happen."

Price benefitted from this lesson; his TV credits are numerous, and he has played guest roles in many major British television series including Doctor Who (in the serial The Face of Evil), Space 1999, The Sweeney. He played the role of Bonney in the BBC’s internationally sold series Target. Back on stage, he played the title role of The Gambling Man in an adaptation of Catherine Cookson's novel. Miss Cookson said in her autobiography: "He was my perfect Gambling Man!".

At this time, he starred in yet another film comedy that featured the cream of British comedy talent, The Amorous Milkman (1975). Back on stage, he played one of the leads in the World Premiere of Woundings at the Royal Exchange Theatre, Manchester, and a memorable Biff in Arthur Miller's Death of a Salesman with Ray McAnally.

Spain
His career took another turn when he moved to live in Spain. This opened up a new market for his talents, which were quickly seen in Calle Nueva. He followed this with other guest roles, and he had a major part in the award-winning film Los Sin Nombre released in the US as The Nameless directed by Jaume Balagueró. He was also in Dagon directed by Stuart Gordon, The Nun and The Sleep of Death, an adaptation of the Japanese novel by Eloy Lozano.

He featured in the Catalan film Excuses directed by Joel Joan. During all this activity, he found time to return to England and play the role of the heartthrob Doctor Bernard McAllister in the long-running series Emmerdale. Over the last few years, he has guest-starred in the Spanish series Anti-vicio, El Comisario, and he had a regular part in the very popular series Los Hombres de Paco. He also featured in the mini-series Alakrana due for release this year. On the big screen, he was in The Possession of Emma Evans, and he played opposite to Carme Elias in the award-winning Planes para Mañana. In Roberto Santiago’s film El Sueño de Iván ("Ivan's Dream"), released in 2011, he played Greg Cullen, the President of FIFA.

At the end of 2010, he co-starred with Michael Ironside in "Transgression", which was released in 2011. Presently, he is working on the well-known Spanish series "Amar en Tiempos Revueltos" ("To Love Is Forever") .

Selected filmography
 Secrets of a Door-to-Door Salesman (1973)
 The Amorous Milkman (1975)
 The Sleep of Death (1980)
 The Nameless (1999)
 Dagon (2001)
 Savage Grace (2007)
 Brain Drain (2009)
 Exorcismus (2010)

Television appearances
 Man at the Top
 The Sweeney
 Target
 Doctor Who (The Face of Evil)
 Space: 1999 (Catacombs of the Moon)
 The Chinese Puzzle
 Robin of Sherwood
 Emmerdale

References

External links
 

Year of birth missing (living people)
English male film actors
English male television actors
Actors from Coventry
Living people